Frame Up is a 1968 Italian noir-crime film directed  by Emilio Miraglia and starring Henry Silva, Beba Lončar and Keenan Wynn.

Plot
A police inspector's son is killed by a gang of thieves and is accused of having killed a police informer.  After being kicked out of the police department, the inspector must discover the truth on his own.

Cast
 Henry Silva as Inspector Sterling 
 Beba Lončar as  Janet 
 Keenan Wynn as Police Commissioner Donald
  Carlo Palmucci as  Gary
 Pier Paolo Capponi as  O'Neil
 Luciano Rossi as Joseph Randolph
  Larry Dolgin as Kelly 
  Charlene Polite as Anne 
 Bob Molden as Rocky

Production
Frame Up was shot at Cinecittà in Rome and on location in San Francisco.

Release
Frame Up was released theatrically in Italy on 13 April 1968 where it was distributed by Unidis. The film grossed a total of 397,425,000 Italian lire on its theatrical run. The film circulated in various edited forms on its initial release. The European version is about Sterling's quest to find a man who murdered his son and framed him for shooting an informant. It is dramatised through flashbacks that lead up to the murder. The American edit of the film was distributed through Heritage Enterprises in 1971 and re-titled The Falling Man which runs at 85 minutes. The edit changes the story and has a new English-language dub and a new score by Marcel Lawler.

See also
 List of Italian films of 1968

Notes

References

External links

Italian crime films
1968 crime films
1960s Italian-language films
English-language Italian films
Films directed by Emilio Miraglia
Films shot in San Francisco
Films shot at Cinecittà Studios
1968 films
1960s Italian films
Films about post-traumatic stress disorder
Italian films about revenge